Lancia Museum (on italian: Museo Vincenzo Lancia) is a museum of the Lancia family and the car brand Lancia. The museum is located in Fobello, Italy.

History 
Inaugurated on 20 September 2009, the exhibition is on the second floor of the Palazzo Giuseppe
Lancia that Vincenzo Lancia himself built as a school building. The museum is established in the honor of the great engineer Vincenzo Lancia. In the house there are photographs, family trees and documents connected with the family. The museum is divided into four rooms that each carry the name of a well-known Lancia model: Augusta, Artena, Astura and Aprilia.

References 

Automobile museums in Italy
Lancia